The 2015 General Aung San Shield Final was the 5th final of the MFF Cup. Ayeyawady United won the match 2-1 with goals from Riste Naumov and Kyaw Min Oo, for their third title. Moukailou scored for Yadanarbon FC. Ayeyawady qualified to AFC Cup competition with its win. The match was played at Bogyoke Aung San Stadium in Yangon. on 27 September 2015 and was the final match of the Bogyoke Aung San Cup.

Background
Ayeyawady United were playing a record 3rd MFF Cup final. They had previously won two, most recently last season's final against Nay Pyi Taw.

It was Yadanarbon's first MFF Cup final.

Ticket allocation
Both Ayeyawady United FC and Yadanarbon FC received a ticket allocation of 10,000 for the game. Ticket price were 500 MMK (normal ticket) and 1000MMK (special ticket).

Route to the final

Ayeyawady United

MFF Cup holders Ayeyawady United entered the competition in the second round as a Myanmar National League club. In their first match, they were drawn at Thuwunna Stadium against MNL-2 team All-University Selection FC. At the Thuwunna Stadium, Ayeyawady United won 7–0 with goals from Pyae Phyo Oo, Lazar, Thiha Zaw and Riste (4 goals). Riste got a hat trick. In the quarterfinal, Ayeyawady United drew a MNL team, Zwegapin United. At the Bogyoke Aung San Stadium, Ayeyawady United drew 2–2 and won (4-3) on penalty shots. In the semifinal round, Ayeyawady United beat Rakhine United 2-0 at home and 1-0 away.

Yadanarbon

Also a Myanmar National League team, Yadanarbon entered the tournament in the second round with 9-0 win over MNL-2 club Horizon. In the quarterfinal, they defeated another second-tier team at Bogyoke Aung San Stadium, Hantharwady United, 2-1. Yadanarbon hosted the first leg of their semifinal on 12 August and defeated Magwe 6-0, with a halftime lead from Keith. They won 2-0 again in the second leg at the Thuwunna Stadium on 19 August with goals from Yeon Gisung and Aung Thu to reach the final for the first time.

Match

Team selection
Ayeyawady United's Captain, Min Min Thu missed the final.
Yadnarbon FC coach didn't choose Nanda Lin Kyaw Chit and Zaw Linn Tun.

Details

Statistics

Broadcasting rights
These matches were broadcast live on Myanmar television.

References

Yadanarbon FC
Ayeyawady United
MFF

General Aung San Shield
2015 in Burmese football